Xiangyun County is a county in the Dali Bai Autonomous Prefecture located in the west-central part of Yunnan province, People's Republic of China.

Administrative divisions
Xiangyun County has 8 towns, 1 township and 1 ethnic township. 
8 towns

1 township
 Luming
1 ethnic township
 Dongshan Yi

Ethnic groups
The Xiangyun County Gazetteer (1996:138-139) lists the following ethnic Yi subgroups. Western Yi and Central Yi are linguistic classifications.

Western Yi (Lalo)
Turen 土人
Tuzu 土族
Qiangyi 羌彝
Central Yi (Lolopo)
Luoluopo 罗罗颇
Luolupo 罗鲁泼
Nanshansu 南山苏
White Luoluo 白倮倮

Climate

References

External links
 Xiangyun County Official Website

County-level divisions of Dali Bai Autonomous Prefecture